Roberta Vinci was the defending champion, but lost to Kirsten Flipkens in the quarterfinals.
Eighth-seeded Nadia Petrova won the title, defeating Urszula Radwańska 6–4, 6–3, in the final.

Seeds

Draw

Finals

Top half

Bottom half

Qualifying

Seeds

Qualifiers

Draw

First qualifier

Second qualifier

Third qualifier

Fourth qualifier

References
 Main draw
 Qualifying draw

UNICEF Open - Singles
2012 Women's Singles